Guaranty Bank may refer to:

 Guaranty Bank (Texas), a defunct bank that operated in Texas and California (1988–2009)
 Guaranty Bank (Wisconsin), a defunct bank that was based in Wisconsin (1923-2017)
 First Guaranty Bank, a Hammond, Louisiana–based bank, established 1934
 Guaranty Bank & Trust, a Mount Pleasant, Texas–based bank, established 1913
 Guaranty Bank and Trust Company, a Denver, Colorado–based bank, established 1955
 Guaranty Bank and Trust Company (Dallas, Texas), a defunct bank that was based in Dallas, Texas (1920–1988)